Zhan Yilin (Chinese: 战怡麟; Pinyin: Zhàn Yílín; born 20 September 1989) is a Chinese football player.

Club career
Born in Shanghai, Zhan joined Genbao Football Academy in July 2000 and was promoted to Shanghai East Asia squad in 2006 for the China League Two campaign. He mainly played as a left winger or left back and sometimes played as a backup for Wu Lei in the club. On 31 May 2008, Zhan scored his first goal in the China League One in a 2–1 home victory against Sichuan FC. This goal was scored within just 16 seconds after kick off, which beat the previous record of 18 seconds set by Sabin Ilie of Changchun Yatai in the 2005 season and became the fastest goal in the China League One. He appeared in 22 league matches in the 2012 season, as Shanghai East Asia won the champions and promoted to the top flight.

Zhan transferred to Chinese Super League side Shanghai Shenhua in February 2013. He was sent to the reserved team in 2016 and 2018.

Career statistics 
Statistics accurate as of match played 31 December 2019.

Honours
Shanghai East Asia
 China League One: 2012
 China League Two: 2007

References

External links
Player stats at Soccerway.com

1989 births
Living people
Chinese footballers
Footballers from Shanghai
Shanghai Port F.C. players
Shanghai Shenhua F.C. players
Chinese Super League players
China League One players
China League Two players
Association football forwards